Achnabat is a small crofting settlement, on the B862, in Inverness-shire, Scotland, within the Scottish council area of Highland.

References

Populated places in Inverness committee area